Jack Welch (born 26 October 1997) is a field hockey player from Australia, who plays as a forward.

Personal life
Jack Welch was born and raised in Hobart, Tasmania.

Career

Domestic leagues

Australian Hockey League
Jack Welch made his debut for the Tassie Tigers in 2015, at the Australian Hockey League (AHL) in Darwin. Throughout his four-season AHL career, Welch won two bronze medals with the Tigers, his first in 2015, and his second during the final edition of the tournament in 2018.

Hockey One
After the introduction of Hockey Australia's new domestic league, Hockey One, in 2019, Welch was named to the rebranded Tassie Tigers team for the competition's inaugural edition.

National teams

Under–21
Welch first appeared for the Australia U–21 side in 2015, at the Sultan of Johor Cup in Johor Bahru.

Following his 2015 debut, Welch represented the team again in 2016, at the Sultan of Johor Cup and the Junior World Cup. At the tournaments, Australia finished first and fourth respectively.

Kookaburras
In 2018, Jack Welch was a member of the Australian Development Squad. Despite this, he was called up and made his senior international debut during a test match against Argentina in Darwin. He then went on to play in the International Hockey Open days later.

Following his 2018 debut, Welch was named to the Kookaburras squad for the 2019 calendar year. During 2019, he has only appeared in the FIH Pro League.

References

External links
 
 
 Jack Welch at Hockey Western Australia

1997 births
Living people
Australian male field hockey players
Male field hockey forwards